Elisabeth of Anhalt (15 October 1545, Dessau – 26 September 1574, Barby) was a German abbess of the secular abbeys at Gernrode and Frose as Elisabeth III of Anhalt.  After she left the convent, she became Countess of Barby by marriage.

Life 
Elisabeth was a daughter of the prince John V of Anhalt (1504–1551) from his marriage to Margaret (1511–1577), the daughter of Elector Joachim I of Brandenburg.

In 1565, Elisabeth was elected abbess of the imperial abbey of St. Cyriac in Gernrode.  Her attempts to improve the financial situation of the heavily indebted met with little success. In 1570, she resigned from her post as abbess and  married.  She was succeeded as abbess by her niece Anna Maria of Anhalt.

She married on 19 July 1570 in Bernburg with Count Wolfgang II of Barby and Mühlingen (1531–1615). A dispute arose between Elisabeth and her brother Prince Joachim Ernest about the Abbey and her claim on Anlat.

From her marriage with Wolfgang, Elisabeth had a son named Christopher.  He died young.  Elisabeth died of "consumption" in 1574 and was buried in Barby.

References 
 Philipp Ernst Bertram, Johann C. Krause: Geschichte des Hauses und Fürstenthums Anhalt: Fortsetzung, vol. 2, Curt, 1782, p. 207
 Johann Samuel Ersch: Allgemeine Encyclopädie der Wissenschaften und Künste in alphabetischer Folge, J. f. Gleditsch, 1842, p. 367 (Online)

Footnotes 

Secular abbesses
House of Ascania
German countesses
Gernrode
Daughters of monarchs
1545 births

1574 deaths